Carole Bradford (born 30 November 1961) is a retired English middle and long-distance runner. She twice won the bronze medal at the IAAF World Women's Road Race Championships, in  1984 (10 km) and 1985 (15 km), as well as winning team gold in both years. She also won a team gold at the 1986 World Cross Country Championships and team silver at the 1984 World Cross Country Championships.

International competitions

References

1961 births
Living people
English female middle-distance runners
English female long-distance runners